The silver-capped fruit dove (Ptilinopus richardsii) is a species of bird in the family Columbidae. It is endemic to Solomon Islands.

Its natural habitat is subtropical or tropical moist lowland forests.

Taxonomy and systematics

Subspecies 

 P. r. richardsii – Ramsay, 1882: The nominate subspecies, found on Ugi and Santa Anna.
 P. r. cyanopterus – Mayr, 1931: Found on Rennell Island and Bellona Island.

References

silver-capped fruit gove
Endemic birds of the Solomon Islands
silver-capped fruit dove
Taxonomy articles created by Polbot